Rio Adio is a 1989 Bulgarian social drama film about the life of an architect, directed by Ivan Andonov. The film is centered on important social themes of self-morality and moral compromise. The film stars Filip Trifonov.

Plot
Stoev (Trifonov) is a talented lead architect whose team wins an international competition for a facility to be built in Rio de Janeiro. Per the terms of the agreement, two members of the winning team (and their spouses) are to go to Brazil, expenses paid, to oversee the construction. All along the design stages, Stoev's understanding has been that he would be going together with his loyal and equally gifted assistant architect. However, the company chief secretly decides to change the terms and go instead of the assistant, threatening Stoev to cancel the whole deal if he doesn't comply. Stoev is left with the dilemma to betray a colleague and friend, or to miss the greatest opportunity in his career (and face the wrath of his nagging overambitious wife). When Stoev is about to choose the former, a mysterious dead body appears in his life, forcing him to take a deeper look into himself and society.

Release and acclaim
The film premiered on 10 April 1989 in Bulgaria. The film was produced by Boyana Film.

Cast
Filip Trifonov as Architect Stoev
Vania Tzvetkova as Lena, Stoev's wife
Petar Popyordanov as Trainee investigator Chocho
Gosho Popruskov as Associate Professor
Georgi Mamalev as Anatomist
Nikola Rudarov as Director Stancho Koev
Georgi Rusev as Neighbour Bay Slavi
Natalia Dontcheva as Daughter Vera
Nadya Todorova as The bookie Tucky
Latinka Petrova as The curious Neda
Ventzislav Iliev as The corpse
Katya Chukova as Daughter
Nikola Todev as Doncho
Dimitar Goranov as Stefan
Pavel Popandov as Waiter
Anani Yavashev as Investigator

See also
List of Bulgarian films

External links
 

1980s Bulgarian-language films
1989 films
1989 drama films
Bulgarian drama films
Films directed by Ivan Andonov